The lac des Commissaires flows in the municipality of Lac-Bouchette, in the MRC Le Domaine-du-Roy Regional County Municipality, in the administrative region Saguenay–Lac-Saint-Jean, in Quebec, in Canada. The lake is popular for recreational and tourist activities.

The surface of "Lac des Commissaires" is usually frozen from the beginning of December to the end of March, however the safe circulation on the ice is generally made from the end of December to mid-March.

Geography 
Its shape has two parts, roughly of similar length. The southern end of the southern part of the lake ends in a narrow bay six kilometers long, curving west. The route 155 connecting La Tuque and Chambord runs along the southern part of the lake.

In the middle of the lake, in the northern part, the lake forms a bulge towards the East, designated "Hail Bay" or "Mirage Lake" (former name "Lac Quaquakamaksis"). The "Commissioners Dam" belongs to the Government of Quebec and is found at the outlet of Lac des Commissaires, which is the main source supplying the Ouiatchouan River. The emissary of the Commissioners lake is the "Commissioners river".

The village of Lac-Bouchette is located on its eastern shore of lakes Bouchette and Ouiatchouane. The mouth of Bouchette Lake is located in its northern part and flows into the southern part of Lake Ouiatchouane. The Ouiatchouan River flows mainly in wooded areas, except the last two kilometers of its route which are agricultural in nature.

Dam of Lac des Commissaires

This "Concrete-gravity" type dam on a rock foundation has a length of 198.7 m. This dam is operated by the "Center d 'expertise hydrique du Québec".

Toponymy 
In 1828, the land surveyor, Joseph Bouchette, assigned the toponym "Lac des Commissaires", in honor of Commissioners Andrew and David Stuart, responsible for an expedition to explore the Saguenay territory. In his Journal of 1732, the surveyor Joseph-Laurent Normandin designates this lake Eskaskouakama, that is to say a word of the Montagnais language which he translates as follows: wood". This surveyor adds: "Indeed this Lake of Costé du Nord is bordered by a fairly high and well wooded land and Costé du Sud is a low land without any wood". In 1890, the land surveyor Elzéar Laberge, in his report on the township of Crespieul, used the toponym "Lac des Commissaires" to identify this body of water.

The toponym "Lac des Commissaires" was registered on December 5, 1968, in the Place Names Bank of the Commission de toponymie du Québec.

See also 
 List of lakes of Canada

References 

Lakes of Saguenay–Lac-Saint-Jean
Le Domaine-du-Roy Regional County Municipality